Khushab (punjabi: خُوشاب) is a town as well as a district of Sargodha Division, located in the Punjab province of Pakistan. The word Khushab means "sweet water." Khushab city also serves as the headquarters of Khushab Tehsil, an administrative subdivision of the district Khushab. It is the 77th largest city of Pakistan by population.

The city of Khushab is the location of the Khushab Nuclear Complex, a critical part of the Pakistan's Special Weapons Programme.

Demographics
The population according to the 1901 census was 11,403. Now it is 50,000.

Etymology
"Khushab" is a combination of two Persian words: khush 
  
(), meaning "sweet or tasty", and aab, meaning "water". A common belief is that the Persians from the west first used the word khush-aab in admiration of the sweet and tasty water found in the historical city situated on the bank of Jhelum River. In time the city became known as Khushab.

Ecosystem

Olive cultivation 
According to local farmers in Pakistan, there is untapped potential in olive cultivation and oil production, which could reduce the country's reliance on imported edible oil. The Pothohar region in Punjab is most suitable for olive cultivation, with wild olives found abundantly in several areas. However, for good yields, modern irrigation systems, proper drainage, and adequate fertilizers are required. Additionally, specific varieties of the plant such as Ottobratica, Coratina, Frantoio, Leccino, and Mirailo, best for olive oil extraction and commercial production, should be planted.

Plantation drive 
The Capital Development Authority planned to plant 5,000 saplings in Islamabad on Independence Day in accordance with the Clean and Green Pakistan campaign. Various areas were allocated a different number of saplings to plant, and citizens, students, and organizations participated in the plantation drive. The Metropolitan Corporation Islamabad also planted 1,000 saplings across the city. This initiative aimed to increase Pakistan's forest cover and mitigate the effects of climate change.

Development projects 
In October 2022, Pakistani government approved over Rs10 billion for the execution of various uplift projects in the country's different districts, including water supply schemes, the construction of small dams, the rehabilitation of schools and other development projects. The funds were allocated during the National Economic Council meeting, which was chaired by the Prime Minister. The government aims to complete these projects on a priority basis to ensure the socio-economic development of the country.

Jalalpur Canal 
In the beginning of 2023, the Punjab Irrigation Department aimed to complete the repair and extension work of Jalalpur Canal, a water source for domestic and irrigation purposes in Jhelum, within six months. The canal's extension would provide more than 4,000 acres of land to farmers for irrigation purposes. To speed up the work, the government approved the allocation of Rs. 200 million to the department.

Bauxite reserves 
The government of Pakistan approved a plan to extract bauxite reserves and utilize them to bolster the country's industrial sector and foreign reserves. A memorandum of understanding had been signed between the government and a Chinese company for the mining and processing of bauxite reserves in the country's southern region. This move is expected to create job opportunities and promote industrial development, helping to stabilize Pakistan's economy.

Notable people
 Sultan Khan (chess player)
 Shah Maroof Khushabi, Sufi saint
 Idris Azad, philosopher, poet, fiction writer, and journalist.
 Wasif Ali Wasif, scholar, poet, and religious mentor.
 Colonel Satya Pal Wahi, former Chairman of the Oil and Natural Gas Corporation of India

References

External links 
 Khushab District

Populated places in Khushab District
Cities in Punjab (Pakistan)